Yang Hua (born 1963) is a Chinese business executive who was CEO of the China National Offshore Oil Corporation (CNOOC). Concurrently, he served as Director and Vice Chairman of the Board. Prior to his appointment as CEO, he was employed by CNOOC in such positions as Manager of the Reservoir Engineering Department, Research Center Project Manager, Director of the Overseas Development Department, Deputy Chief Geologist, and CFO. Yang received his Bachelor of Science Degree in Petroleum Engineering from China University of Petroleum (Beijing) in 1982, and an MBA degree from the MIT Sloan School of Management. Following his resignation as CEO, he was succeeded by Li Fanrong.

References

Chinese business executives
China National Offshore Oil Corporation
Living people
1963 births
MIT Sloan School of Management alumni